The Spero River is a perennial river located in the West Coast or South West region of Tasmania, Australia.

Course and features
The Spero River rises below Thirkell Hill on an unnamed range within the  Southwest Conservation Area. The river flows generally north by west, joined by the Pery River and one minor tributary before reaching its mouth and emptying into Spero Bay, south east of Point Hibbs, eventually flowing into the Southern Ocean. The river descends  over its  course.

The mouth area has also been subjected to both plans and actual modification of reefs and blockages for navigation of the lower portion of the river. Access to the area in the 1930s was also augmented by tracks from Birchs Inlet on Macquarie Harbour.

Much of the course of the river is isolated with very limited direct contact with the outside world, however a Huon Pine timber venture in the 1930s and 1940s saw some level of activity in the area.

A small steam ship the SS Gundiah was specifically bought to service the Spero River timber industry.

The river name is also applied to the cartographic material available from Tasmap for the area.

See also

 Rivers of Tasmania

References

South West Tasmania
Rivers of Tasmania